Keith John Read (born 4 May 1961) is a former Australian politician. He was the Labor member for Murray in the Western Australian Legislative Assembly from 1989 to 1993.

References

1961 births
Living people
Members of the Western Australian Legislative Assembly
Australian Labor Party members of the Parliament of Western Australia
People from Kalgoorlie